The archdeacons in the Church in Wales are senior Anglican clergy who serve under their dioceses' bishops, usually with responsibility for the area's church buildings and pastoral care for clergy.

Archdeacons

Timeline of changes to and new archdeaconries

Resignations and retirements

Notes

References

Archdeacons